In enzymology, a farnesol 2-isomerase is an enzyme that catalyzes the chemical reaction

2-trans,6-trans-farnesol  2-cis,6-trans-farnesol

Hence, this enzyme has one substrate, 2-trans,6-trans-farnesol, and one product, 2-cis,6-trans-farnesol.

This enzyme belongs to the family of isomerases, specifically cis-trans isomerases.  The systematic name of this enzyme class is 2-trans,6-trans-farnesol 2-cis-trans-isomerase. This enzyme is also called farnesol isomerase.

References

 

EC 5.2.1
Enzymes of unknown structure